"Hung Up" is a song by British singer-songwriter Paul Weller released in March 1994. The song reached number 11 on the UK Singles Chart in April 1994, making it Weller's highest-charting solo single. The single was re-released as a track on Modern Classics: The Greatest Hits.

Lyrical content
The song is written from the viewpoint of an old man refusing to admit defeat. The lyrics begin "Hidden in the back seat of my head / Some place, I can't remember where."

References

1994 singles
1994 songs
Go! Discs singles
Song recordings produced by Brendan Lynch (music producer)
Songs written by Paul Weller